Margo Kitsy Brodie ( Williams; born April 12, 1966) is a United States district judge of the United States District Court for the Eastern District of New York. She became chief judge of the court on February 1, 2021.

Early life and education 
Brodie was born Margo Kitsy Williams in St. John's, Antigua. She earned a Bachelor of Arts degree in 1988 from St. Francis College in Brooklyn and then a Juris Doctor in 1991 from the University of Pennsylvania Law School.

Professional career 
Brodie worked for the New York City Law Department from 1991 until 1994, and then at the law firm Carter, Ledyard & Millburn from 1994 until 1999.  She then joined the office of the United States Attorney for the Eastern District of New York in 1999 as an Assistant United States Attorney.  Brodie was Deputy Chief of the General Crimes Section from 2006 to 2007, Chief of the General Crimes Section from 2007 until 2009, Counselor to the Criminal Division from 2009 to 2010, and Deputy Chief of the Criminal Division from 2010 to 2012.

Federal judicial service 
On June 7, 2011, President Barack Obama nominated Brodie to a seat on the United States District Court for the Eastern District of New York that had been vacated by Judge Allyne R. Ross, who took senior status in April 2011. She received a hearing before the Senate Judiciary Committee on September 7, 2011 and was reported by a voice vote to the floor of the Senate on October 6, 2011 and was placed on the Senate Executive Calendar the same day. On February 27, 2012, the United States Senate voted 86–2 to confirm Brodie as a United States District Judge. She received her commission on February 29, 2012. She became Chief Judge on February 1, 2021.

See also 
 List of African-American federal judges
 List of African-American jurists

References

External links

1966 births
Living people
21st-century American judges
21st-century American women judges
African-American judges
Assistant United States Attorneys
Judges of the United States District Court for the Eastern District of New York
St. Francis College alumni
United States district court judges appointed by Barack Obama
University of Pennsylvania Law School alumni